The  is an electric multiple unit (EMU) commuter train type operated by the private railway operator Keihan Electric Railway in Kyoto, Japan, since 1983.

The series won the Laurel Prize from the Japan Railfan Club in 1984.

Overview 
The 6000 series was introduced in 1983 with 11 7-car sets built by the end of 1983. The remaining 38 cars would be built in 10 batches spreading from 1986 until 1993.

The sixth batch, built in 1989, was a seven-car set with four cars being built as prototypes for next-generation VVVF traction motors. In 1993, three of those test vehicles would be renumbered and incorporated into an existing 7000 series set. In lieu, three replacement cars would be built in December 1993 as the tenth and last batch of the series.

These trains would be the basis for the 7000 series introduced in 1992.

Interior 
Passenger accommodation consists of longitudinal bench seating throughout.

Formations 
The seven-car trains are formed as follows, with two or three motored ("M") cars and four or five non-powered trailer ("T") cars.

 "Mc" cars are motored driving cars (with driving cabs).
 "M" cars are motored intermediate cars.
 "T" cars are unpowered trailer cars.
 The "Mc 6000" and "M 6150" cars each have two scissors-type pantographs.

Gallery

References

External links 

  

Electric multiple units of Japan
6000 series
Train-related introductions in 1983
Kawasaki multiple units
1500 V DC multiple units of Japan